Sprayberry is a surname. Notable people with the surname include:

Dylan Sprayberry (born 1998), American actor
Ellery Sprayberry (born 2000), American actress and voice over artist
James M. Sprayberry (born 1947), United States Army officer
Mike Sprayberry, American emergency manager